Dame Elizabeth Pauline Lucy Corley  (born 19 October 1956) is a British businesswoman and writer. She is Chair of the Impact Investing Institute. She was CEO of Allianz Global Investors, initially for Europe and then globally, from 2005 to 2016. She continued to act as an advisor to the company in various capacities until the end of 2019. She is also a Non-Executive Director at BAE Systems plc, Morgan Stanley Inc. and Schroders plc.

Career
Corley started her career immediately after leaving school around 1975. She joined Sun Alliance Life & Pensions where she spent ten years, eventually being appointed to deputy head of broker sales. In 1985, she joined Coopers & Lybrand Management Consultants, where she was a consultant and then partner. In 1993, she joined Mercury Asset Management, which later became Merrill Lynch Investment Managers, serving as managing director and head of distribution for Europe, the Middle East, Africa and Asia Pacific.

In 2005, she joined Allianz Global Investors Europe as CEO and was a member of the Executive Committee of Allianz Asset Management (the holding company of Allianz's asset management businesses) from October 2005 until 2016. She was Global Chief Executive Officer of Allianz Global Investors from January 2012 through to March 2016.  She continued to act as an advisor to the company in various capacities until the end of 2019.

In June 2014, she was asked to chair a panel of market practitioners to contribute to the Fair and Effective Markets Review, a joint review initiated by the Treasury, the Bank of England and the Financial Conduct Authority into the way wholesale FICC markets operate.

She has been a trustee of the British Museum since 2016 and chairs the Investment Committee. She is a member of the CFA Future of Finance Council Advisory Council, an Advisory Council member of the AQR Asset Management Institute and a member of the 300 Club. She is a Non-Executive Director/Board Member of FTSE and S&P100 companies. Between 2017-18, Corley chaired a UK Government-commissioned review and then taskforce to make recommendations on how to grow social impact investing in the UK.

In July 2021, it was announced that Corley was selected as the next chair of Schroders, commencing the position in April 2022. As part of the role, Corley will step down from the boards of Morgan Stanley and Pearson plc.

Awards
In 2006, Corley was named as Personality of the Year by Funds Europe. Financial News named Elizabeth Most Influential Woman in Asset Management in 2009, CEO of the Year in 2011 and Most Influential Person in Asset Management in 2012.

Corley was appointed Commander of the Order of the British Empire (CBE) in the 2015 New Year Honours for services to the financial sector and Dame Commander of the Order of the British Empire (DBE) in the 2019 Birthday Honours for services to the economy and financial services.

In May 2011, the State of Bavaria awarded her the annual “Europamedaille” for special merits for Bavaria in Europe.

Other

Corley has a post graduate diploma in management studies, is a fellow of the Royal Society of Arts and a fellow of the CFA Society of the UK. In 2016, she received an honorary doctorate from the London Institute of Banking and Finance and an Honorary Fellowship from London Business School in 2019.

Crime fiction
Corley also writes crime fiction novels. She was vice-chairperson of the Crime Writers' Association and is still an active member  Corley was on the shortlist for the 2008 Dagger in the Library award. Her series of Detective Chief Inspector Andrew Fenwick currently spans five books (Requiem Mass (1998), Fatal Legacy (2000), Grave Doubts (2006), Innocent Blood (2008), and Dead of Winter (2013)).

References

20th-century British businesswomen
21st-century British businesswomen
21st-century British novelists
Living people
British crime fiction writers
British women in business
Dames Commander of the Order of the British Empire
1956 births